Simrothula is a genus of air-breathing land slugs, terrestrial pulmonate gastropod mollusks in the family Veronicellidae, the leatherleaf slugs.

Species
Species within the genus Simrothula include:
 Simrothula paraensis

References

Veronicellidae